Tunney Morgan Hunsaker (September 1, 1930 – April 27, 2005) was a mid-20th century American professional boxer, who also served as the Police Chief of Fayetteville, West Virginia.

Early life
He was born in the Western Kentucky town of Princeton, in Caldwell County. In his youth he served in the United States Air Force, stationed at Lackland Air Force Base in San Antonio, Texas.

Boxing career
In 1960, Hunsaker was Cassius Clay's (later Muhammad Ali) first opponent in a professional boxing bout. After the fight Hunsaker said, "Clay was as fast as lightning ... I tried every trick I knew to throw at him off balance but he was just too good". In a thumbnail profile of the fight the following January, young Cassius was reported as having remarked that Hunsaker's style was far different from what Clay had been exposed to as an amateur and Olympian; the young fighter admitted to nervousness going in, and that Hunsaker's aforementioned pro style, had given him trouble.   This respect appears genuine, as it was lasting—in his autobiography, Ali said Hunsaker dealt him one of the hardest body blows he ever took in his career. Ali and Hunsaker became good friends and stayed in touch over the years. Hunsaker said he did not agree with Ali's decision to refuse military service, but praised him as a great humanitarian and athlete.

In the fight game, Hunsaker was a small heavyweight, perhaps better suited for light-heavy classification (175 lbs. limit); today, he would most likely compete as a cruiserweight (190 lbs. limit). He fought as a boxer-puncher, by his own telling. Hunsaker once appeared on the undercard at Madison Square Garden. Hunsaker ended up with a record of 17 wins with 15 defeats with 8 wins by knockout. 
His career ended after a boxing-related head injury suffered on April 6, 1962, in Beckley, West Virginia. Rushed to a Beckley hospital, Hunsaker was in a coma for 9 days during which he underwent two brain operations. His boxing record stood at 18 wins, 15 losses and 9 KOs.

Law enforcement career
Hunsaker served as Fayetteville police chief for 38 years, and was the youngest police chief in the history of West Virginia. He was later inducted into the Law Enforcement Hall Of Fame.

Death
Hunsaker suffered the physical effects of his last match for the rest of his life. He was 74 when he died on 27 April 2005, having been afflicted with Alzheimer's disease in his last years. His body was buried in Huse Memorial Park cemetery, Fayetteville, West Virginia.

Personal life

Hunsaker was active in the Oak Hill Church of the Nazarene for many years, teaching a Sunday School class for fifth and sixth grade boys. He was three times named Sunday School Teacher of the Year. At the time of his death in 2005 he had been married to wife Patricia for over thirty years.

In the US state of West Virginia, the Fayette Station Bridge carrying County Route 82 over the New River at the bottom of New River Gorge was named after him.

Professional boxing record

|-
|align="center" colspan=8|17 Wins (8 knockouts, 9 decisions), 15 Losses (7 knockouts, 8 decisions), 1 Draw 
|-
| align="center" style="border-style: none none solid solid; background: #e3e3e3"|Result
| align="center" style="border-style: none none solid solid; background: #e3e3e3"|Record
| align="center" style="border-style: none none solid solid; background: #e3e3e3"|Opponent
| align="center" style="border-style: none none solid solid; background: #e3e3e3"|Type
| align="center" style="border-style: none none solid solid; background: #e3e3e3"|Round
| align="center" style="border-style: none none solid solid; background: #e3e3e3"|Date
| align="center" style="border-style: none none solid solid; background: #e3e3e3"|Location
| align="center" style="border-style: none none solid solid; background: #e3e3e3"|Notes
|-align=center
|Loss
|17–15–1
|align=left| Joe Shelton
|KO
|10
|April 6, 1962
|align=left| Beckley-Raleigh County Convention Center, Beckley, West Virginia
|align=left|
|-
|-align=center
|Win
|17–14–1
|align=left| Thomas Dejarnette
|KO
|1
|February 24, 1962
|align=left| West Virginia State Penitentiary, Beckley, West Virginia
|
|-
|-align=center
|Loss
|16–14–1
|align=left| Sonny Banks
|KO
|2
|October 16, 1961
|align=left| Detroit, Michigan
|
|-
|-align=center
|Loss
|16–13–1
|align=left| Thomas Dejarnette
|TKO
|8
|September 28, 1961
|align=left| West Virginia State Penitentiary, Beckley, West Virginia
|align=left|
|-
|-align=center
|Win
|16–12–1
|align=left| Herman Wilson
|TKO
|6
|August 22, 1961
|align=left| Fairgrounds Stadium, Louisville, Kentucky
|
|-
|-align=center
|Loss
|15–12–1
|align=left| Tod Herring
|UD
|10
|April 25, 1961
|align=left| City Auditorium, Houston, Texas
|
|-
|-align=center
|Loss
|15–11–1
|align=left| Alejandro Lavorante
|KO
|5
|March 21, 1961
|align=left| Freeman Coliseum, San Antonio, Texas
|align=left|
|-
|-align=center
|Loss
|15–10–1
|align=left| Cassius Clay
|UD
|6
|October 29, 1960
|align=left| Freedom Hall, Louisville, Kentucky
|align=left|
|-
|-align=center
|Loss
|15–9–1
|align=left| Tom McNeeley
|TKO
|9
|April 12, 1960
|align=left| Boston Arena, Boston, Massachusetts
|align=left|
|-
|-align=center
|Loss
|15–8–1
|align=left| Johnny Jenkins
|SD
|6
|February 5, 1960
|align=left| Madison Square Garden, New York City
|
|-
|-align=center
|Loss
|15–7–1
|align=left| Jim O'Connell
|PTS
|10
|January 16, 1960
|align=left| Kenova, West Virginia
|
|-
|-align=center
|Loss
|15–6–1
|align=left| Hosea Chapman
|UD
|12
|November 14, 1959
|align=left| Memorial Auditorium, Fayetteville, West Virginia
|align=left|
|-
|-align=center
|Loss
|15–5–1
|align=left| Bert Whitehurst
|TKO
|10
|September 30, 1959
|align=left| Charlotte, North Carolina
|
|-
|-align=center
|Loss
|15–4–1
|align=left| Ernie Terrell
|PTS
|8
|July 24, 1959
|align=left| Freedom Hall, Louisville, Kentucky
|
|-
|-align=center
|Win
|15–3–1
|align=left| Bennie Thomas
|PTS
|8
|July 1, 1959
|align=left| Louisville, Kentucky
|
|-
|-align=center
| Draw
|14–3–1
|align=left| Hosea Chapman
|SD
|12
|June 20, 1959
|align=left| Ravenswood, West Virginia
|align=left|
|-
|-align=center
|Win
|14–3
|align=left| Billy Walters
|KO
|1
|May 2, 1959
|align=left| Fayetteville, West Virginia
|
|-
|-align=center
|Win
|13–3
|align=left| Terrell Pruitt
|UD
|6
|March 28, 1959
|align=left| Freedom Hall, Louisville, Kentucky
|
|-
|-align=center
|Win
|12–3
|align=left|Tiny Gibson
|KO
|3
|September 30, 1958
|align=left| Fayetteville, West Virginia
|
|-
|-align=center
|Win
|11–3
|align=left| Herbert Hair
|KO
|2
|August 16, 1958
|align=left| Memorial Auditorium, Fayetteville, West Virginia
|
|-
|-align=center
|Loss
|10–3
|align=left| Emil Brtko
|KO
|2
|June 23, 1958
|align=left| High School Stadium, Charleroi, Pennsylvania
|align=left|
|-
|-align=center
|Win
|10–2
|align=left| Jim Saddler
|SD
|6
|June 9, 1953
|align=left| Municipal Auditorium, San Antonio, Texas
|
|-
|-align=center
|Win
|9–2
|align=left| O'Neal Crocker
|TKO
|4
|June 2, 1953
|align=left| Ringside Club, Houston, Texas
|
|-
|-align=center
|Win
|8–2
|align=left| Carl Griffin
|KO
|1
|April 20, 1953
|align=left| Dallas Sportatorium, Dallas, Texas
|align=left|
|-
|-align=center
|Win
|7–2
|align=left| Joe Arthur
|SD
|10
|March 10, 1953
|align=left| Municipal Auditorium, San Antonio, Texas
|
|-
|-align=center
|Win
|6–2
|align=left| Ranchero Alonzo
|PTS
|8
|February 10, 1953
|align=left| Municipal Auditorium, San Antonio, Texas
|
|-
|-align=center
|Loss
|5–2
|align=left| Ranchero Alonzo
|PTS
|6
|December 30, 1952
|align=left| Municipal Auditorium, San Antonio, Texas
|
|-
|-align=center
|Loss
|5–1
|align=left| Whitey Berlier
|PTS
|10
|November 5, 1952
|align=left| Houston, Texas
|
|-
|-align=center
|Win
|5–0
|align=left| Pat Viola
|UD
|6
|October 20, 1952
|align=left| Municipal Auditorium, San Antonio, Texas
|
|-
|-align=center
|Win
|4–0
|align=left| Jesus Vargas
|KO
|3
|October 7, 1952
|align=left| Municipal Auditorium, San Antonio, Texas
|
|-
|-align=center
|Win
|3–0
|align=left| Ranchero Alonzo
|PTS
|6
|September 23, 1952
|align=left| Municipal Auditorium, San Antonio, Texas
|
|-
|-align=center
|Win
|2–0
|align=left| Pat Viola
|PTS
|6
|July 31, 1952
|align=left| Austin, Texas
|
|-
|-align=center
|Win
|1–0
|align=left| Pat Viola
|UD
|4
|July 22, 1952
|align=left| Municipal Auditorium, San Antonio, Texas
|

References

Further reading
Facing Ali (book) by Stephen Brunt (2002). Guilford, Connecticut: The Lyons Press.
Muhammad Ali: His Life and Times by Thomas Hauser (1991). New York: Simon & Schuster.

External links

1930 births
2005 deaths
American municipal police chiefs
Boxers from West Virginia
People from Fayetteville, West Virginia
American members of the Church of the Nazarene
American male boxers
20th-century Methodists